"Satellite Skin" is a single released by indie rock band Modest Mouse. It is the first single from their EP, No One's First and You're Next.

The song was originally slated for an April 18, 2009 released date, but was pushed back to May 26, 2009 because Isaac Brock didn't like the color of the vinyl, as it wasn't the right shade of orange.  The vinyl is limited to 4000 hand numbered copies.

Music video
The surreal music video for "Satellite Skin" was directed by Kevin Willis. Willis is known for his frequent involvement as co-producer in the music videos of alternative metal band Tool. The video includes stop-motion animation, namely portraying "birdhouse creatures". The creatures are involved in a forest ritual where eggs from inside the houses are hatched. The video debuted on MySpace on May 15.

Track listing

Credits
Side A: "Satellite Skin"
 Joe Plummer - Drums
 Isaac Brock - Vocals, Guitar, Kalimba
 Eric Judy - Bass
 Tom Peloso - Piano, Lap Steel
 Johnny Marr - Guitar, Slide
 Jeremiah Green - Percussion
Side B: "Guilty Cocker Spaniels"
 Isaac Brock - Guitar, Vocals
 Eric Judy - Bass, Acoustic Guitar
 Benjamin Weikel - Drums
 Dann Gallucci - Keyboards

Cover Art by Joshua Marc Levy

References

Modest Mouse songs
2009 singles
2009 songs
Epic Records singles
Songs written by Johnny Marr
Songs written by Isaac Brock (musician)
Songs written by Jeremiah Green
Songs written by Eric Judy
Songs written by Joe Plummer
Songs written by Tom Peloso